In mathematics, a composition algebra  over a field  is a not necessarily associative algebra over  together with a nondegenerate quadratic form   that satisfies

A composition algebra includes an involution called a conjugation:  The quadratic form  is called the norm of the algebra.

A composition algebra (A, ∗, N) is either a division algebra or a split algebra, depending on the existence of a non-zero v in A such that N(v) = 0, called a null vector. When x is not a null vector, the multiplicative inverse of x is  When there is a non-zero null vector, N is an isotropic quadratic form, and "the algebra splits".

Structure theorem

1-dimensional composition algebras only exist when .
Composition algebras of dimension 1 and 2 are commutative and associative.
Composition algebras of dimension 4 are called quaternion algebras.  They are associative but not commutative.
Composition algebras of dimension 8 are called octonion algebras.  They are neither associative nor commutative.

For consistent terminology, algebras of dimension 1 have been called unarion, and those of dimension 2 binarion.

Instances and usage

The matrix ring  has long been an object of interest, first as biquaternions by
Hamilton (1853), later in the isomorphic matrix form, and especially as Pauli algebra.

The squaring function  on the real number field forms the primordial composition algebra.
When the field  is taken to be real numbers , then there are just six other real composition algebras. 
In two, four, and eight dimensions there are both a division algebra and a "split algebra":
 binarions: complex numbers with quadratic form  and split-complex numbers with quadratic form ,
 quaternions and split-quaternions,
 octonions and split-octonions.

Every composition algebra has an associated bilinear form B(x,y) constructed with the norm N and a polarization identity:

History
The composition of sums of squares was noted by several early authors. Diophantus was aware of the identity involving the sum of two squares, now called the Brahmagupta–Fibonacci identity, which is also articulated as a property of Euclidean norms of complex numbers when multiplied. Leonhard Euler discussed the four-square identity in 1748, and it led W. R. Hamilton to construct his four-dimensional algebra of quaternions. In 1848 tessarines were described giving first light to bicomplex numbers.

About 1818 Danish scholar Ferdinand Degen displayed the Degen's eight-square identity, which was later connected with norms of elements of the octonion algebra:
Historically, the first non-associative algebra, the Cayley numbers ... arose in the context of the number-theoretic problem of quadratic forms permitting composition…this number-theoretic question can be transformed into one concerning certain algebraic systems, the composition algebras...

In 1919 Leonard Dickson advanced the study of the Hurwitz problem with a survey of efforts to that date, and by exhibiting the method of doubling the quaternions to obtain Cayley numbers. He introduced a new imaginary unit , and for quaternions  and  writes a Cayley number .

The doubling method has come to be called the Cayley–Dickson construction.

In 1923 the case of real algebras with positive definite forms was delimited by the Hurwitz's theorem (composition algebras).

In 1931 Max Zorn introduced a gamma (γ) into the multiplication rule in the Dickson construction to generate split-octonions. Adrian Albert also used the gamma in 1942 when he showed that Dickson doubling could be applied to any field  with the squaring function to construct binarion, quaternion, and octonion algebras with their quadratic forms. Nathan Jacobson described the automorphisms of composition algebras in 1958.

Composition algebras without'' a multiplicative identity were found by H.P. Petersson (Petersson algebras) and Susumu Okubo (Okubo algebras) and others.

See also
 Freudenthal magic square
 Pfister form
 Triality

References

Further reading

 

Composition algebras
Quadratic forms
Historical treatment of quaternions